Hospital is a district of the San José canton, in the San José province of Costa Rica. It is one of the four administrative units that form San José downtown properly. The district houses, along with Merced district, the main commercial activity of the city, and is the most populous of the four central districts.

Geography 
Hospital has an area of 3.3 km² and an elevation of 1160 metres.

It lies in the center of the canton, the only one which limits with districts of San José and not with other cantons. The district borders (clockwards) with Merced district to the north, El Carmen and Catedral districts to the east, San Sebastián and Hatillo districts to the south, and Mata Redonda district to the west.

Demographics 

For the 2011 census, Hospital had a population of 19270 inhabitants.

Locations
This district comprehend several "barrios" or neighbourhoods, like Almendares, Ángeles, Bolívar, Cant, Colón (part of it), La Merced, Pacífico (part of it), Pinos, Salubridad, San Bosco, San Francisco, Santa Lucía and Silos. Between its boundaries there is a lot of important institutions and buildings, from government, health and culture of the country.

 Parque Central de San José.
 Hospital San Juan de Dios. One of the three main hospitals of the country.
 Hospital de Niños. Hospital specialized in infants.
 Teatro Popular Melico Salazar. The second most important theater in the country, after Costa Rica's National Theater.

Road transportation 
The district is covered by the following road routes:
 National Route 1
 National Route 2
 National Route 27
 National Route 110
 National Route 167
 National Route 176
 National Route 213
 National Route 214
 National Route 215

References 

Districts of San José Province
Populated places in San José Province

External links
Municipalidad de San José. Distrito Hospital – Website of San Jose Mayor, includes a map of the district and related info.